Farid Touil (born 10 December 1974 in Constantine) is an Algerian former footballer who played in the Algerian Championnat National.

Career
A center forward, Touil played for US Chaouia and ES Sétif before signing with MC Alger in July 2008. He finished his playing career with CS Constantine.

Touil scored the winning goal in the second leg of the 2006–07 Arab Champions League final. He also scored the winning goal in the first leg of the 2007–08 Arab Champions League final.

After he retired from playing, Touil became a member of ES Sétif's coaching staff.

Honours

Club
 Winner of Arab Champions League twice with ES Sétif in 2007 and 2008
 Winner of Algerian League once in 2007 with ES Sétif

References

External links
 Player profile 

1974 births
Living people
Algerian footballers
Association football forwards
USM Blida players
ES Sétif players
US Chaouia players
MO Constantine players
MC Alger players
CS Constantine players
21st-century Algerian people